Abrostola violacea is a moth of the family Noctuidae. It is found in Africa. The type location is the Ngorongoro Crater (Tanganyka, Arusha).

References 

Plusiinae
Moths of Africa
Moths described in 1958